Jago is a British company which used to produce a range of kit cars principally Jeep styled between 1965 and 1997. The company is still based in Chichester, West Sussex and now manufactures for a number of industries including, concealment work for councils and telecommunications, theming and the arts.

Geoff Jago founded a company called Geoff Jago Custom Automotive in 1965 making Street Rod type vehicles. In 1971 he made the vehicle for which the company became most famous, the Geep. This used glass fibre panels moulded off an original World War II Willys Jeep and fitted to a chassis with Ford Anglia 105E mechanical parts. An alternative version using Morris Minor parts was added in 1974 and a Ford Escort version in 1976.

The company name was changed to Jago Automotive in 1979 and is now Jago Developments Ltd

The Ford Escort-based Samuri, a four-seat, beach buggy type vehicle costing £795 plus tax for the kit was announced in 1983.

The Geep name changed to Sandero in 1991 to avoid any copyright issues. The last Sandero kits were made around 1997. The Sandero 4x4 kit is still available from Belfield 4x4 Engineering; this version is based around a Land Rover Defender.

External links 
 Jago Developments website
 Jago Geep (& others, but mostly Geep) Owners Facebook Group, active group as of 2021, including buy & sell
 Jago Owner's club  (Jago Owners Club, old website)
 Jago Owners Club new website (2008 to 2012)
 Belfield 4x4 engineering

References

Kit car manufacturers
Defunct motor vehicle manufacturers of England
Companies based in Sussex